Afrophoca is an extinct genus of earless seal from Miocene-age marine deposits in Libya.

References

Miocene pinnipeds
Monachines
Prehistoric carnivoran genera
Pinnipeds of Africa
Fossil taxa described in 2014